Anson Brown (1800 – June 14, 1840) was a U.S. Representative from New York.

Born in Charlton, New York, Brown attended the public schools, and graduated from Union College, Schenectady, New York, in 1819.  He studied law, was admitted to the bar and commenced practice in Ballston Spa, New York.  He was one of the first directors of the Ballston Spa State Bank (later the Ballston Spa National Bank), which was organized in 1830.

Brown was elected as a Whig to the Twenty-sixth Congress and served from March 4, 1839, until his death in Ballston Spa, June 14, 1840.
He was interred in the cemetery of the Ballston Spa Cemetery Association.

See also
List of United States Congress members who died in office (1790–1899)

References

1800 births
1840 deaths
Union College (New York) alumni
New York (state) lawyers
American bankers
People from Charlton, New York
Whig Party members of the United States House of Representatives from New York (state)
19th-century American politicians
19th-century American lawyers
19th-century American businesspeople